Black Duck Brook and Winterhouse is a local service district and designated place in the Canadian province of Newfoundland and Labrador. It consists of the unincorporated fishing settlements of Black Duck Brook and Winterhouse on the Port au Port Peninsula. The communities had a combined population of 57 in the Canada 2006 Census.

The communities are closely associated with Franco-Newfoundlander history. The communities may also be known as L'Anse-aux-Canards and Maisons-d'Hiver in French.

Geography 
Black Duck Brook and Winterhouse is in Newfoundland within Subdivision E of Division No. 4.

Demographics 

Government 
Black Duck Brook and Winterhouse is a local service district (LSD) that is governed by a committee responsible for the provision of certain services to the community. The chair of the LSD committee is Bernie Duffenais.

See also 
List of communities in Newfoundland and Labrador
List of designated places in Newfoundland and Labrador
List of local service districts in Newfoundland and Labrador

References 

Designated places in Newfoundland and Labrador
Local service districts in Newfoundland and Labrador